Arutz HaYeladim (The Childrens Channel; Formerly: Arutz Shesh (ערוץ 6) channel 6) is an Israeli youngster cable television channel owned by RGE, through subsidiary NOGA Communications Limited. It was one of the first cable channels in Israel, along with Arutz HaMishapa, Arutz HaSratim and Arutz HaSport, It is aimed at children ages 7–14.

History

The channel first launched in November 8, 1989, as a part of Israeli cable's trial broadcasting prior to the 1990 official launch. At first the channel broadcast only two hours a day, and in its first two years was based primarily on purchased programs. In 1991, the channel began involving segments with human hosts and presenters. These segments grew to bigger live shows over the years and gave some of the presenters their tickets to stardom. The channel's growing popularity among children also led to many educational campaigns, regarding issues such as safety and tolerance.

In 1996, the channel's content was transferred to the control of the new company "Noga Tikshoret" ("Venus communication"), and the channel updated its programming to more interactive nature while also adding more original programs - a direction that the channel is following to this day.

In 2010, Cartoon Network became a television block on the channel appearing weekdays 11AM to 2PM, showing kids' shows from the channel dubbed in Hebrew. This happened because Cartoon Network's pan-European version was no longer available in Israel, having been removed years before the block's launch. The block was ended in 2019, when yes bought the rights of the shows.

Oded Menashe, the last of the "original" presenters from the channel's first years, left in 2005 after 14 years; at the time no presenter had stayed longer at the channel. As of 2012, Menashe's record was surpassed by Tal Mosseri, who joined the channel in 1997 and left in mid-2015 after 18 years as a presenter. Besides Menashe, Museri and Kobi Machat, who joined the channel in 2000 and left in early 2012 after 12 years as a presenter, none of the other presenters, past or present, has ever stayed in the channel for more than nine consecutive years.

Presenters

Presenters in the past
Sendi Bar
Yael Bar Zohar
Adi Ezroni
Oded Menashe
Efrat Rayten
Michal Yannai
Tom Baum
Liron Revivo
Oded Paz
Ben Zini
Anna Zak

Presenters of the present
Hezi Din (since 2013)
Kevin Rubin (since 2019)
Orel Tzabari (since 2020)
Yarden Vizel (since 2020)
Reef Neeman (since 2021)
Omer Hazan (since 2021)
Maya Tzafir (since 2021)
Tal Mosseri (1997-2015, return in 2022)

See also

List of programs broadcast by Arutz HaYeladim

External links
Official Site

Television channels in Israel
Children's television networks
Television channels and stations established in 1989
1989 establishments in Israel
Childhood in Israel